Arzachena Academy Costa Smeralda is an Italian association football club located in Arzachena, Sardinia. The club currently play in Serie D, the fourth tier of Italian football.

History
The club was founded in 1964.

In the season 2002–2003 the club was promoted to Serie D and won promotion to Serie C as Group G champions in the 2016–17 Serie D season.

The club was liquidated in 2019 due to financial issues, and refounded that same year under the ownership of entrepreneur and Spezia majority stakeholder Gabriele Volpi, restarting from Serie D.

Colours and badge
The colors of the club are white and green.

Current squad

References

External links
Official homepage

Football clubs in Italy
Association football clubs established in 1964
Football clubs in Sardinia
Italian football clubs established in 1964